Sir Philip Courtenay ( – 29 July 1406), of Powderham, Devon was the fifth son of Hugh Courtenay, 10th Earl of Devon (1303–1377). He was the founder of the cadet dynasty known as "Courtenay of Powderham", seated at the manor of Powderham, until then a former Bohun manor of little importance, whilst the line descended from his elder brother, the Earls of Devon of the mediaeval era, continued to be seated at Tiverton Castle and Okehampton.

Origins
Sir Philip Courtenay was the fifth son of eight sons of Hugh Courtenay, 10th Earl of Devon (1303–1377) and Margaret de Bohun, daughter of Humphrey de Bohun, 4th Earl of Hereford by his wife Elizabeth Plantagenet (1282–1316), a daughter of King Edward I.

Military and naval career
He was known as a rash, angry and temperamental man but was skilful in naval and military affairs. Philip served during the Spanish War. He was with Edward the Black Prince at the famous victory of the Battle of Najera. He was knighted before the battle with his brothers Peter Courtenay, K.G., and Hugh Courtenay, K.G.

On his return, Sir Philip was made Admiral of the West on 7 October 1372 responsible for defending a coast plagued by pirates he held that post until 16 July 1376. In 1373 he was put in charge of a large supply convoy to Gascony. In August, the expedition took the Castle of Gurry.

Back in England, he launched a petition to parliament protesting against the corruption of the Stannaries, which he claimed was preventing the protection and patrol of the coastline. That August, Philip was engaged with Peter in a desperate battle against the Spaniards during which they were both captured as supplies failed to get through to Gascony. Two Bristol burgesses paid a large ransom for their release. In return, they were granted trading exemptions from customs tax.

On 8 March 1380 he was once again appointed Admiral of the West till 1381. In February 1383, he became Lord Lieutenant of Ireland, serving for 10 years under King Richard II. He attended the parliament that met at Salisbury in April 1384, but in July his duties were taken over by the deputies. In 1385 the King gave him powers of administration in Dublin. He did not stay long and returned to London on 6 May. That Christmas the Great Council met to discuss charges of extortion levelled at Courtenay. In January 1386 he was dismissed from his post, and arrested by the Crown in March. Sir Robert de Vere was created Marquess of Dublin and Viceroy. By 1387, De Vere was styling himself as duke of Ireland. Courtenay was elected to the Commons in October 1386, and petitioned against the perceived injustice. He received compensation for the loss of Ireland. By the end of 1387, the Lords Appellant had banished de Vere.

Landholdings
Courtenay also served as Steward of Cornwall in the 12th year of the reign of Richard II. Pope Urban VI challenged the English to join a Crusade in 1383. John of Gaunt opposed any such venture; whereas the clerical party was supported by Henry le Despencer, Bishop of Norwich and Sir Philip Courtenay. Gaunt made the Priory of Somborne over to the Courtenays. There in Hampshire they attacked and tortured the Carmelites, and when they accused Gaunt of treason, the knights caused the death of the Friar.

It was perhaps as well for his privilege that Sir Philip was elected to parliament in February 1383, for he was not a favourite of Richard II. Edward III had granted him a pension of £100 for life, which was confirmed by Richard II in 1378. The Black Prince had granted him two annuities of £50 each from the Duchy of Cornwall, which were doubled in 1393.

Richard II demanded his presence in parliament because he had been given the official post of Keeper of Dartmoor Forest in 1370, and granted substantial estates in Devon from 1380. In March 1388, he received four parks, which he forfeited to the Merciless Parliament. In 1389 he was given the post of Lord Warden of the Stannaries and granted the Royal Manor of Haslebury Plucknett for a period of six years. In 1391, the manor of Dartmoor and the manor of Bradninch were granted to him and his wife, for the sum of £39 p/a. All these landholding decisions were confirmed by Henry IV.

In December 1404, the King ordered Philip to grant Dartmoor and Bradninch to Henry, Prince of Wales.

Ireland
Courtenay was still Steward of the Duchy of Cornwall until 1392. Two years later he was preparing to go on an expedition with the king to Ireland. Philip was in charge of royal household arrangements as the steward. He was to this end commissioned to find fish from Devon and Cornwall for provisions. Whilst in Ireland he soon fell out with Robert de Vere, Duke of Ireland, the royal favourite, and was removed as royal troops commissioner. He also clashed with Robert Wikeford, the Archbishop of Dublin.

Military experience
By 1399 Sir Philip was an experienced soldier called upon to suppress the Welsh revolt. He called up the Commissions of Array. He bought transporters of the soldiers and horses for the 1402 expedition to Brittany, and the sailing against the King of Scotland in 1400.

Politician
He criticised ships lying idle in the docks, and reported to the Royal Council. They urged Henry IV to bring the experience of the West Country men in provisioning stores against France in 1402. Sir Philip also sat on the Council of 1405. Despite falling into terrible debts governing Ireland, he was exonerated of any crimes and pardoned by the King in 1393. When two men were dispossessed of their property Philip encouraged arbitrators Sir Peter Chudleigh and Sir James Chudleigh MP to decide. Many men complained of Courtenay's conduct: Sir Thomas Pomeroy was returned some property lost in Exeter in 1402. And Nicholas Potyngton managed to renew his complaint of 1393 for the loss of the manor of Bickleigh. Abbot of Newenham's property was stolen by sixty retainers; Courtenay ignored the summons to appear in Westminster. This he also did when summoned to answer for his conduct in forbidding the Abbot of Beaulieu access to his abbey.

Imprisonment
Sir Philip was imprisoned in the Tower in November 1402 for clerical abuses against the Church. On 29 November he was forced to pay a recognizance of £100 by Sir John Arundell, and to Sir John Herle and Sir William Sturmy a surety of £1000.

Inheritance
Philip had been very fortunate to receive property on the death of relatives. In 1357 he received the reversion of the manor of Moreton on the death of his brother, Thomas. In 1374 he had gained Broadwindsor and Cadleigh on the death of his brother, Sir Peter Courtenay, and the reversion of Honiton and Nuneham Courtenay, and East Coker. The Earl left him 100 marks in his will. In 1377, Sir Philip returned advowsons of Honiton and East Coker to Exeter Cathedral to construct a memorial to his father. His mother also left him seven manors from 1391 as well as her chapel.

Philip was granted Powderham Castle by his mother upon her death in 1391, as well as seven other manors. He was succeeded by his son, Richard, Lord Chancellor and Bishop of Ireland, upon his death on 29 July 1406. At that time he held one manor and hamlet in Dorset; three manors and a moiety and three advowsons in Somerset; and seventeen manors and five advowsons in Devon with some smaller properties. He was valued in 1405 to have an income of £140 pa.

Marriage and children
Courtenay married Anne Wake, the daughter of Sir Thomas Wake of Blisworth, Northamptonshire, by Alice de Pateshulle, the daughter of Sir John de Pateshulle. They had three sons and two daughters:
Richard Courtenay (died 1415), Bishop of Norwich, son and heir.

Sir John Courtenay (died before 1415), second son, who pre-deceased his father and elder brother. He married Joan Champernoun (died 1419) daughter of Sir Richard Champernoun of Modbury, Devon. They had two sons, Sir Philip Courtenay (18 January 1404 – 16 December 1463), of Powderham, heir to his uncle Bishop Richard Courtenay, and Sir Humphrey Courtenay.
Sir William Courtenay.
Agnes Courtenay, who married Sir Otes Champernoun.
Margaret Courtenay, who married (as his first wife) Sir Robert Cary (died circa 1431) of Cockington, Devon, twelve times Member of Parliament for Devon. Some genealogies list her as without progeny, but their son was Philip Cary.

Ancestry

Notes

References

Further reading
 
 
 

1342 births
1406 deaths
English MPs February 1383
14th-century English Navy personnel
English MPs 1386
Lords Lieutenant of Ireland
Medieval English knights
Philip
English admirals
English MPs February 1388
English MPs January 1390
English MPs 1393
English MPs 1395
English MPs 1399
English MPs 1401
Members of the Parliament of England (pre-1707) for Devon
Younger sons of earls